North Caicos Airport  is an airport serving North Caicos, the second largest of the Turks and Caicos Islands.

Facilities

References

External links
 

Airports in the Turks and Caicos Islands